The Maurice Burlaz Trophy is a prize that is awarded to the national association that has achieved the best results in UEFA's men's youth competitions over the previous two seasons. The trophy is named after Maurice Burlaz, former vice-chairman of the UEFA Youth Committee.

Winners

Most Wins 

  Spain - 8× (1 shared)
  Germany - 3×
  Portugal - 3× (1 shared)
  England - 1×
  France - 1×
  Turkey - 1× (1 shared)

References 

UEFA trophies and awards
European football trophies and awards